Harbor Boulevard (formerly Spadra Road) is a north–south road corridor in the counties of Los Angeles and Orange. One of the busiest routes in Orange County, the thoroughfare passes through some of the most densely populated areas in the region and carries about 8 percent of the county's bus riders. The route provides access for local residents to travel to work and for drivers travelling from Valley Boulevard in the City of Industry via Fullerton Road to Newport Beach.

Route description

Harbor Boulevard runs in Orange County from Costa Mesa through the cities of Fountain Valley, Santa Ana, Garden Grove, Anaheim, Fullerton, and La Habra. It crosses into Los Angeles County upon entering La Habra Heights, then 2 miles later, it turns into Fullerton Road in the unincorporated community of Rowland Heights just over the Los Angeles County line.

History

Previously, Harbor Boulevard ended at Fullerton Road in La Habra Heights. Commuters were directed to turn left onto Fullerton Road through a two-lane windy road to Pathfinder Road. An extension was proposed to extend Harbor Boulevard to Pathfinder Road in Rowland Heights in the 1980s. This extension would provide an alternate route for commuters coming from Orange County as they were limited to Hacienda Road, Brea Boulevard, and SR 57 at the time. The route would also connect Los Angeles County with Orange County with the developing unincorporated community Rowland Heights and provide access to SR 60 from Orange County. Originally opposed by residents of La Habra Heights, with one person stating that Harbor Boulevard would become a "freeway", the four-lane extension was granted when Shea Homes broke ground for their newest community, Vantage Pointe, in Rowland Heights. The extension opened in 1992, though the two-lane Fullerton Road is still open for residents who live on that street to use.

The portion of Harbor Boulevard between La Palma Avenue in Anaheim to Whittier Boulevard in La Habra was part of the historical routing of U.S. Route 101 (US 101), which was at the time the Coast Route from the Mexican Border to Oregon. This portion was also formerly part of SR 72, but this segment was later relinquished to the cities of Anaheim, Fullerton, and La Habra.

When the extension of Harbor Boulevard opened in 1992, there were plans to make Harbor Boulevard the official SR 39 between Whittier Boulevard and Colima Road in order to close the gap SR 39 currently has, but signs were never erected and it is unknown when this segment will be signed.

North Harbor Boulevard, where it rises from La Habra and passes over the Puente Hills, follows the historical route of the 1769 Portolà expedition, first Europeans to explore inland California.

Major intersections

Transportation
The Orange County Transportation Authority began the Central Harbor Boulevard Transit Corridor Study in 2016 to improve transit along Harbor Boulevard in northern and central Orange County between Westminster Boulevard in Santa Ana and Chapman Avenue in Fullerton. The study will analyze and develop transportation options to move people through the area.

History
In 1976, the Orange County District Attorney declared the stretch in Garden Grove with six gay bars a "red light area" and attempted to close the bars. While formal charges were filed, they were dismissed a year later with no convictions.

Protests marches over the Anaheim police shootings in July 2012 were centered around Harbor. A fatal shooting by police officers on July 21 was followed by a second on July 22. On July 29, 200 protesters walked from the Anaheim police headquarters toward Disneyland. They were stopped at the intersection of Harbor Boulevard and Ball Road by a line of riot police and officers on horseback. Both shootings were eventually ruled justified by the Orange County District Attorney.

Points of interest

Current
 Disneyland Resort
 Anaheim Convention Center
 Crystal Cathedral 
 Fox Theatre Fullerton 
 Whittier Law School
 Orange Coast College

Former
 Kona Lanes

In popular culture
Anaheim native Gwen Stefani mentions Harbor Boulevard in the song "Cool".

Orange County native Mel C. Thompson uses Harbor Boulevard as the main backdrop for his novel "Harbor Boulevard".

References

Streets in Los Angeles County, California
Streets in Orange County, California
Boulevards in the United States
U.S. Route 101